Oliver Courtenay Soames (born 27 October 1995) is an English cricketer who played for Hampshire. He made his first-class debut on 1 April 2018 for Loughborough MCCU against Sussex as part of the Marylebone Cricket Club University fixtures. He made his Hampshire debut against Worcestershire in the County Championship on 4 September 2018. Soames was released by Hampshire ahead of the 2021 County Championship.

References

External links
 
Oli Soames at CricketArchive (subscription required)

1995 births
Living people
English cricketers
Hampshire cricketers
Loughborough MCCU cricketers
English cricketers of the 21st century